Markovščina is a clustered village in the Municipality of Hrpelje-Kozina in the Littoral region of Slovenia.

Geography
Markovščina lies in the heart of the karst Materija Lowland, also known as the Podgrad Lowland, a dry valley extending from Kozina to Starod. It is connected by road to Materija to the northwest and Podgrad to the southeast.

Name
Markovščina was first attested in written records in 1295 and 1371 as sancti Marci (and as S. Marco in 1 475, de Marcossa in 1512, and Marcouschena in 1694). The name is derived from the adjective markovski 'Mark's' from the saint's name Mark (cf. the similarly suffixed name Ajdovščina < ajd- 'pagan'). The name therefore means 'settlement near St. Mark's Church', to which the current Saint Anthony's Church was formerly dedicated. An alternative name for Markovščina, attested in a 1295 manuscript, was Novak(i).

Church
The local church is dedicated to Saint Anthony of Padua and belongs to the Parish of Slivje.

References

External links

Markovščina on Geopedia

Populated places in the Municipality of Hrpelje-Kozina